Antoine Verglas (born in Paris, 1962) is a New York City based photographer who obtained popular acclaim for his uninhibited documentary-style fashion photographs of 1990s supermodels such as Claudia Schiffer and Stephanie Seymour.

Early life
Antoine Verglas was born and raised in Paris, where he attended E.S.C School of Business and, on occasion,  worked as a model for TV commercials. That is how he got his start hosting a TV show Cinq sur Cinq [Five on Five] for teenagers, presenting video clips, movie trailers and interviewing celebrities, including Sharon Stone among many others. Antoine started taking photographs of his college girlfriend, Ford model Catherine Ahnell and in 1990 moved to New York City to become a photographer.

Importance
In the 1990s, Antoine Verglas introduced a new style of fashion photography when he captured models Tatjana Patitz, Stephanie Seymour, Claudia Schiffer and Cindy Crawford in a series of intimate, documentary style photographs that ran in several international editions of Elle magazine. Prior to that fashion editorials were highly poised. Antoine Verglas' photographs were more candid and uninhibited, with natural light. This intimate style of capturing a personality has become known as the “Verglas Signature.” It is highly sought after to this day by all the top fashion magazines such as Elle, Vogue, GQ, Esquire, Maxim, and Sports Illustrated.

Career
Through the years Antoine Verglas went on to have successful career in commercial photography creating images for Victoria's Secret, Revlon and Maybelline among many others as well as magazines such as Vogue, Elle, Maxim, Sports Illustrated, GQ and Playboy.

Calypso St. Barth
Along with Christiane Celle, Antoine Verglas was a co-founder of Calypso St. Barth, a Caribbean-accented multi-brand retailer with more than 35 stores, including stores in Manhattan, the Hamptons, Paris, St. Tropez and St. Barth. In 2007, Calypso Christiane Celle and Antoine Verglas sold majority interest in the company to Solera Capital LLC, a private equity investment firm. Antoine is now invested in concept store Clic  and Hudson studios  , Mindy Meads is CEO of Calypso St. Barth.

Art Scene
On the art scene one of Antoine's photographs broke records at Philipps De Pury auction in London selling for 15,000 GBP in 2015. 
Antoine spends his time between St. Barth, Paris, Montauk and New York City.

References

External links 
 Official web site
 Calypso St. Barth

American photographers
Living people
1962 births
French emigrants to the United States